Dmitry Aleksandrovich Bragin (born 19 May 1982)  is a Russian racing driver currently racing in the Russian Circuit Racing Series. As one of the most decorated racing drivers in his country, he has managed to become a champion in almost all leading motorsport disciplines with 14 championship titles. He is the Russian champion in autocross at (2002), rallycross (2004-2005, 2012), rallying (2008-2009), touring car (2015—2019, 2022), and winter track racing (2017). He also competed in the European Touring Car Cup, winning the single-makes trophy in 2014.

References

External links

1982 births
Living people
Sportspeople from Tolyatti
Russian racing drivers
Russian rally drivers
Russian Circuit Racing Series drivers
European Touring Car Cup drivers
European Rallycross Championship drivers